Elfin Cove Seaplane Base  is a state-owned public-use seaplane base located in Elfin Cove, on Chichagof Island in the Hoonah-Angoon Census Area of the U.S. state of Alaska. Scheduled airline service is subsidized by the Essential Air Service program.

The National Plan of Integrated Airport Systems for 2011–2015 categorized it as a general aviation facility (the commercial service category requires at least 2,500 enplanements per year). As per the Federal Aviation Administration, this airport had 196 passenger boardings (enplanements) in calendar year 2008, 265 in 2009, and 305 in 2010.

Facilities and aircraft
Elfin Cove Seaplane Base has one seaplane landing area designated NW/SE which measures 10,000 by 1,500 feet (3,048 x 457 m). For the 12-month period ending December 31, 2006, the airport had 500 aircraft operations, an average of 41 per month: 60% air taxi and 40% general aviation.

Airlines and destinations

Statistics

References

Other sources

 Essential Air Service documents (Docket DOT-OST-2002-11586) from the U.S. Department of Transportation:
 Order 2003-1-27 (January 28, 2003): selecting Alaska Seaplane Service, LLC, to provide subsided essential air service at Elfin Cove and Pelican, Alaska, at an annual subsidy rate of $177,681 for a two-year term from February 1, 2003, through January 31, 2005.
 Order 2005-5-3 (May 10, 2005): selecting Alaska Seaplane Service to provide essential air service (EAS) to Pelican and Elfin Cove, Alaska, and establishing a subsidy rate of $216,593 per year.
 Order 2007-9-7 (September 7, 2007): granting the Petition for Reconsideration of Alaska Seaplane Service, LLC, and extending its subsidized essential air service (EAS) term at Elfin Cove and Pelican, Alaska, to a four-year term, through May 31, 2011.
 Order 2011-3-11 (March 9, 2011): re-selecting Alaska Seaplane Service, LLC, to provide essential air service (EAS) at Elfin Cove and Pelican, Alaska, at annual subsidy rates of $75,391 at Elfin Cove and $185,721 at Pelican, from June 1, 2011, through January 31, 2015. Elfin Cove, Alaska: Docket OST-2002-11586. Scheduled Service: Five nonstop round trips per week in the 18-week peak and two nonstop round trips per week in the 34-week off-peak to Juneau. Aircraft: DeHavilland Beaver, six seats.
 Order 2011-3-19 (March 15, 2011): correcting the payout formula for Elfin Cove.

External links
 FAA Alaska airport diagram (GIF)
 Topographic map from USGS The National Map

Airports in the Hoonah–Angoon Census Area, Alaska
Essential Air Service
Seaplane bases in Alaska